Emporia is an independent city in the Commonwealth of Virginia, surrounded by Greensville County,  United States. Emporia and a predecessor town have been the county seat of Greensville County since 1791. As of the 2020 census, the population was 5,766, making it the third-least populous city in Virginia. The Bureau of Economic Analysis combines the city of Emporia with surrounding Greensville County for statistical purposes.

History

Emporia has long been a transportation crossroads. The Meherrin River, like the Nottoway River and the Blackwater River, empties to the southeast into Albemarle Sound. The Town of Hicksford (originally Hicks' Ford) was settled by Captain Robert Hicks (1658-1739) in the Virginia Colony, where the Fort Road of eastern Virginia crossed the Meherrin River en route to Fort Christanna. The road was a major north-south trail used by native peoples and sometimes called the "Halifax road".  Capt. Hicks was an Indian trader who resided in Prince George Co. prior to moving his family to Hicksford upon becoming the Commander of Fort Christanna. (His surname is spelled both "Hicks" and "Hix" in colonial records.) In 1709, Hicks purchased a land tract of 1280 acres along the northside of the Meherrin River that has been previously surveyed by Arthur Kavanaugh.

Greensville County separated from Brunswick county in 1781 and Hicksford became the county seat (court convening monthly at a nearby tavern). In May 1781, British Col. Banastre Tarleton's cavalry crossed at Hicksford while raiding Greensville and Southampton counties.

After statehood, the Virginia General Assembly recognized the Town of Belfield on the river's northern bank in 1798, and Hicksford on the southern bank the next year.

In the following decades, the surrounding area remained rural, and development in Hicksford exceeded that of Belfield. An 1847 account documented 12-20 dwellings in Hicksford worth about $10,025 and Belfield's buildings worth $3050; in 1865 Hicksford's buildings were valued at $20,700 and Belfield's at $3650.  However, by 1885 Hicksford had only grown to $22,915 while Belfield had grown to $7300.

During the American Civil War, the Petersburg Railroad (to Weldon), built in 1830, was a tactical prize as Union troops sought to isolate the confederate capitol. In 1857, Belfield was a stop on the Petersburg Railroad.  Two battles for the control of the Weldon Railroad were fought near Petersburg during the Siege of Petersburg in June 1864 and September 1864. On December 7, 1864, 28,000 Union troops led by Major General Gouverneur K. Warren tried to sever that key supply route further south by uprooting tracks, and managed to stop Confederate troops under Major General Wade Hampton from destroying the Meherrin river bridge. However, when they retreated, Confederates rebuilt the railway line. After the war, the Wilmington and Weldon Railroad was leased to the Wilmington, Columbia and Augusta Railroad, which went bankrupt in 1878.

Greensville County native and delegate Benjamin D. Tillar Jr. (1855-1887) received a charter for the Atlantic and Danville Railway, which he planned would go from Portsmouth as had the Weldon railroad, but more westward through the Meherrin river towns. In 1887, Hicksford and Belfield merged, forming the newly incorporated town of Emporia.  It was named after the town of Emporia, Kansas, home town of Tillar's friend U.S. Senator Preston B. Plumb of Kansas. However, the railroad boom proved short-lived, as poor farm conditions and the Panic of 1893 caused the county's population to decrease between 1880 and 1890. The Seaboard and Roanoke Railroad also ran through Emporia.

Emporia was re-chartered in 1892, and the town issued its first bonds (to establish a water plant, lighting and street improvements) in 1900. It hosted an agricultural fair in 1906, and brick buildings replaced frame structures. Banks were chartered, followed by land improvement companies and insurance companies, then various stores, automobile companies and cola bottlers.

The Virginia General Assembly re-chartered the Town of Emporia as an independent city in 1967, five years after the Norfolk and Western Railway purchased and reorganized the Atlantic and Danville Railway. Now, a major north-south CSX railway line crosses a Norfolk Southern east-west line in Emporia. Also, U.S. Route 58 crosses Emporia east-west and Interstate 95 and U.S. Route 301 crosses north-south, so providing services for travelers continues to be important in modern Emporia.

Historic buildings in Emporia include the Belfield-Emporia Historic District, Hicksford-Emporia Historic District, Greensville County Courthouse Complex, Greensville County Training School, H. T. Klugel Architectural Sheet Metal Work Building, Old Merchants and Farmers Bank Building, and Village View, all of which are listed on the National Register of Historic Places.

Geography
Emporia is located at  (36.693018, -77.53809).

The city is located about 65 miles south of Richmond, about 80 miles west of Norfolk and about 60 miles north of Rocky Mount, North Carolina.

Governance
The City of Emporia is governed by a Council/Manager system. There are seven members of City Council elected from districts and a weak Mayor elected at large. City Council and the Mayor are elected to four year terms, in Federal Election years. Their terms are staggered so that not all members are elected at once.

The City of Emporia is also served by its own Treasurer, Commissioner of the Revenue, Sheriff and General Registrar. The Courts System, Greensville County Sheriff, Commonwealth's Attorney and the Public Schools are shared with Greensville County.

A major source of the revenue for Greensville County now comes from speeding tickets issued to out of state travelers along I-95. This benefits both Virginia lawyers and the local economy.
Emporia is the location of several voting houses which art part of Greensville Virginia's voting district I.

Climate
The climate in this area is characterized by hot, humid summers and generally mild to cool winters.  According to the Köppen Climate Classification system, Emporia has a humid subtropical climate, abbreviated "Cfa" on climate maps.

Demographics

2020 census

Note: the US Census treats Hispanic/Latino as an ethnic category. This table excludes Latinos from the racial categories and assigns them to a separate category. Hispanics/Latinos can be of any race.

2010 Census

As of the 2010 United States Census, there were 5,927 people living in the city. 62.5% were Black or African American, 32.7% White, 0.7% Asian, 0.3% Native American, 0.1% Pacific Islander, 2.1% of some other race and 1.5% of two or more races. 4.4% were Hispanic or Latino (of any race).

As of the census of 2000, there were 5,665 people, 2,226 households, and 1,406 families living in the city.  The population density was 821.9 people per square mile (317.5/km2).  There were 2,412 housing units at an average density of 349.9 per square mile (135.2/km2).  The racial makeup of the city was 56.15% Black or African American, 42.45% White, 0.07% Native American, 0.53% Asian, 0.07% Pacific Islander, 0.30% from other races, and 0.42% from two or more races.  1.48% of the population were Hispanic or Latino of any race.

There were 2,226 households, out of which 29.2% had children under the age of 18 living with them, 37.5% were married couples living together, 21.0% had a female householder with no husband present, and 36.8% were non-families. 32.2% of all households were made up of individuals, and 17.4% had someone living alone who was 65 years of age or older.  The average household size was 2.43 and the average family size was 3.05.

By percentage of counties or independent cities, Emporia has the highest population of Muslims in the United States as of the 2010 census, with 28.99% of the independent city being adhering Muslims.

In the city, the population was spread out, with 25.2% under the age of 18, 8.1% from 18 to 24, 25.6% from 25 to 44, 20.6% from 45 to 64, and 20.6% who were 65 years of age or older.  The median age was 39 years. For every 100 females, there were 83.4 males.  For every 100 females age 18 and over, there were 78.1 males.

The median income for a household in the city was $30,333, and the median income for a family was $35,743. Males had a median income of $27,772 versus $21,657 for females. The per capita income for the city was $15,377.  About 11.4% of families and 16.0% of the population were below the poverty line, including 21.5% of those under age 18 and 14.5% of those age 65 or over.

Festivals 

The Emporia Bicycling Club hosts regular group rides, including the annual Great Peanut ride which attracts hundreds of bicyclists who ride to visit a peanut farm and are treated to hearty meals and live entertainment at camp.

The Virginia Pork Festival was held each second Wednesday in June. Over 40,000 pounds of pork is served alongside alcoholic beverages, hushpuppies and sweet potato french fries. The festival is currently on hold due to lack of funding.

Education
Greensville County Public Schools serves both Emporia and Greensville County. Its high school is Greensville County High School.

Circa 1972 there was an effort by Emporia residents to create a separate school division. On June 22, 1972, the United States Supreme Court denied the creation of the district on a 5-4 basis, with the four dissenters having been appointed by U.S. president Richard Nixon.

Notable people

 John N. Dalton, Governor of Virginia
 Willie Gillus, former NFL quarterback
 Benjamin S. Griffin, retired U.S. Army General
 June Harding, actress, artist
 Maurice Hicks, former NFL running back
 Henry Jordan, NFL player in Pro Football Hall of Fame
 Wynne LeGrow, Democratic politician
 Sharon Manning, pro basketball player (Sharon now coaches the Greensvile County Highschool's basketball team.)
 John Y. Mason (1799-1859), U.S. Secretary of the Navy, Congressman, U.S. Attorney General
 Theresa Merritt, actress
 Vern Morgan, baseball player and coach
 Hermie and Elliott Sadler, NASCAR racecar drivers
 Raynor Scheine, actor
 Bryant Stith, basketball player, University of Virginia and NBA
 E. J. Wilson, NFL defensive lineman for Tampa Bay Buccaneers
 Larry D. Wyche, retired U.S. Army Lieutenant General
 Lawrence Lucie, musician

See also
 National Register of Historic Places listings in Emporia, Virginia

References

External links

 City of Emporia

 
Cities in Virginia
County seats in Virginia
Populated places established in 1887
1887 establishments in Virginia
Black Belt (U.S. region)
Majority-minority counties and independent cities in Virginia